The Five Power Defence Arrangements (FPDA) are a series of bilateral defence relationships established by a series of multi-lateral agreements between Australia, Malaysia, New Zealand, Singapore, and the United Kingdom, all of which are Commonwealth members that once belonged to the British Empire.

Signed in 1971, the FPDA consists of the five powers consulting each other "immediately" in the event or threat of an armed attack on any of the FDPA members for the purpose of deciding what measures should be taken jointly or separately in response.

There is no specific commitment to intervene militarily, and the agreement is merely consultative. The Five Powers Defence Arrangements do not refer to exclusive economic zones (EEZ), and the enforcement of a state's EEZ rights is a matter for that state, which may request the assistance of other states in so doing.

History

The FPDA was set up following the termination of the United Kingdom's defence guarantees of Malaya under the Anglo-Malayan Defence Agreement, as a result of the UK's decision in 1967 to withdraw its armed forces east of Suez. Under the Five Powers Defence Arrangements, the five 'powers' (Australia, Malaysia, New Zealand, Singapore and the United Kingdom) are to consult each other "immediately" in the event or threat of an armed attack, although there is no specific commitment to intervene militarily. The FPDA provides defence co-operation between the countries, establishing an Integrated Air Defence System (IADS) for Peninsular Malaysia and  Singapore based at RMAF Butterworth under the command of an Australian Air Vice-Marshal (2-star). RMAF Butterworth, was under the control of the Royal Australian Air Force until 1988, and is now run by the Royal Malaysian Air Force but hosts rotating detachments of aircraft and personnel from all five countries.

In 1981, the five powers organised the first annual land and naval exercises. Since 1997, the naval and air exercises have been combined. In 2001, HQ IADS was redesignated Headquarters Integrated "Area" Defence System. It now has personnel from all three branches of the armed services, and co-ordinates the annual five-power naval and air exercises, while moving towards the fuller integration of land elements. An annual FPDA Defence Chiefs' Conference (FDCC) is hosted by either Malaysia or Singapore, and is the highest military professional forum of the FPDA and serves as an important platform for dialogue and exchange of views among the Defence Chiefs. There is also a Five Powers Defence Arrangements Ministerial Meeting (FDMM).

John Moore, then Minister of Defence of Australia said, "As an established multilateral security framework, the FPDA has a unique role in Asia. It is of strategic benefit to all member nations and, in Australia's view, to the wider Asia-Pacific region." Malaysia's CDF, former General (GEN) Tan Sri Dato' Sri Zulkifeli Bin Mohd Zin concurred: "We can help each other... and cooperate with one another."

In the latest New Zealand defence White Paper released in June 2016, it was outlined that given New Zealand was a longstanding member of the Five Power Defence Arrangements, it would, "meet its commitments should Malaysia or Singapore be subject to a military attack."

40th anniversary
On 1 November 2011, Singapore hosted FPDA's 40th anniversary celebrations, with the defence ministers, aircraft and servicemen from all five signatory countries converging on Changi Air Base (East) to participate in the event. Later, a gala dinner was hosted by Singaporean Defence Minister Ng Eng Hen at Singapore's Istana whereupon they called on the Prime Minister of Singapore—Mr Lee Hsien Loong to discuss a multitude of issues. Codenamed Exercise Bersama Lima, the three days joint exercise tested the readiness and co-operation between all participating countries and concluded on 4 November 2011.

50th anniversary
On 18 October 2021, FPDA celebrated its 50th anniversary with joint air and naval displays involving the ships and aircraft of the member countries. These were observed by Singaporean Defence Minister Ng Eng Hen and the High Commissioners of Australia, Malaysia, New Zealand and the United Kingdom. Prior to this, a two-week joint exercise had taken place, known as Exercise Bersama Gold in honour of the FPDA's golden jubilee. It was the first FPDA exercise held since the start of the COVID-19 pandemic and involved 2,600 military personnel, air and maritime sea training exercises, and a virtual jungle warfare workshop. Participating ships included the Australian amphibious assault ship  and New Zealand's  replenishment tanker. The British destroyer  also took part in the exercise but missed the final days due to technical issues. Whilst in the region at the time,  did not participate in the exercise, likely due to the presence of United States Marine Corps on the aircraft carrier.

Personnel and facilities

Australia
Australia maintains the following personnel and facilities at RMAF Butterworth in Malaysia:
No. 19 Squadron (19SQN) – A ground support squadron.
No. 92 Wing Detachment Alpha (92WG Det A), with AP-3C Orions
2nd/30th Training Group, Australian Army
Australian Defence Force Investigative Service (Joint Investigation Office Butterworth)
Joint Health Command (Butterworth Clinic)
Land Command Liaison Section, Australian Army (as at May 2007)
Rifle Company Butterworth, Australian Army

United Kingdom
The United Kingdom has the following personnel and facilities based in Malaysia and Singapore in support of the FPDA: 
 British Defence Singapore Support Unit – A naval support facility at Sembawang in Singapore operated by Strategic Command (previously Joint Forces Command) Staff at Sembawang total three Ministry of Defence civil servants, one Chief Petty Officer and one Petty officer (RN). The present UK Defence Adviser to Singapore as of 2015 is a Royal Navy Commander.
 Staff in the Integrated Area Defence System Headquarters (HQ IADS) at RMAF Butterworth in Penang, Malaysia consisting of one Wing Commander, one Squadron Leader, one Lieutenant Commander, one Major and one Flight Sergeant.

Exercises

Since its formation, the FPDA has conducted multilateral military exercises involving all five member states with operational command alternating between Singapore and Malaysia. These began as intermittent Air Defence Exercises (ADEX) in the 1970s before land and sea components were added in the 1980s. They have since become yearly fixtures and have grown in complexity, combining air, sea and land components to address both conventional and non-conventional threats. Whilst most exercises take place off the coast of Malaysia and Singapore, they have also extended into the South China Sea. Non-FPDA representatives are often invited to observe the drills.

Examples of FPDA exercises include:
 Exercise Bersatu Lima – The first major exercise held in 1972.
 Exercise Platypus – The first land-based FPDA exercise which was held in Australia in 1981.
 Exercise Starfish – One of the first FPDA naval exercises, inaugurated in 1981. It has been replaced by Exercise Bersama Lima.
 Exercise Suman Warrior – A land-based exercise which originated in the 1990s and takes place in Australia and New Zealand.
 Exercise Flying Fish – The first combined air, sea and land exercise which was first held in 1997. With 39 warships and 160 combat aircraft, the inaugural exercise in 1997 was one of the largest to date and took place over 13 days.
 Exercise Bersama Padu – The name of this exercise translates to "Together United" in Malay. The inaugural exercise in 2006 took place in Singapore and the South China Sea and consisted of 21 warships, 85 aircraft and 1 submarine as well as ground components. Operational planning took place at Paya Lebar Air Base, Singapore.
 Exercise Suman Protector – Inaugurated in 2007, it is held every five years as a culminating activity in the FPDA's exercise cycle.
 Exercise Bersama Shield – Formerly the Integrated Air Defence System air defence exercise until 2004.
 Exercise Bersama Lima – Translates to "Together Five" in Malay. These exercises were inaugurated in 2004 and have taken place on a yearly basis ever since.
 Exercise Bersama Gold – A replacement of Exercise Bersama Lima to mark the FPDA's golden jubilee in October 2021.

References

External links
 Five Power Defence Arrangements
 The Five Power Defence Arrangements: If It Ain't Broke...

Anglosphere
Military alliances involving Australia
Military alliances involving New Zealand
Military alliances involving the United Kingdom
Military alliances involving Malaysia
Treaties of Singapore
International military organizations
International organizations based in Asia
Intergovernmental organizations established by treaty
Australia–New Zealand relations
Treaties concluded in 1971
20th-century military alliances
21st-century military alliances
New Zealand–United Kingdom relations
Cold War treaties
Australia–Malaysia relations
Australia–Singapore relations
Malaysia–Singapore relations
Malaysia–United Kingdom relations
Singapore–United Kingdom relations
Australia–United Kingdom relations
New Zealand–Singapore relations
Malaysia–New Zealand relations